Zoner Photo Studio is a software application developed by Zoner Software. It includes a bitmap editor and image file manager used for editing digital photographs. It is used in its country of origin  (Czech Republic) and around the world. A new version is published annually.

As of 2022, this software is available for the Windows operating system.

History 

In 2004, Zoner Media Explorer was renamed Zoner Photo Studio because the product focus switched to strictly digital photography.

Version 12 
Version 12 introduced the program's division into modules: Manager, Viewer, Editor, and raw module, to increase the ease of working simultaneous with photo management,editing, etc. It added a default charcoal gray interface, intended to ease photo viewing.

Updates 

 Version 13 brought support for dual monitors and 64-bit versions of Windows.

 Version 14 brought support for batch upload to the developer's Zonerama web gallery service and GPU acceleration via CUDA and OpenCL.

 Version 15 added an Import module. 

 Version 16 completed the Editor's switch to using the Side Panel. 

 Version 17 revamped the raw module and made the Catalog more central to the Manager. 

 Version 18 brought a major interface change. The five modules were merged into three: Manager, Develop, and Editor. Develop enables non-destructive edits to raw files and other supported files. This version was subscription based and added fine-tuned retouching tools and support for layer based editing.

System requirements 
 OS: Microsoft Windows 10 (64 bit) - version 1809 or newer 
Processor: Intel or AMD that supports SSE2  
Memory: 4GB RAM 
Hard Drive: 480MB 
Resolution: 1280×800 or higher

Sources

References

External links
 Zoner Photo Studio on zoner.cz
Zoner Photo Studio 11 on fotografovani.cz
Zoner Photo Cloud service on photographyblog.com

This article uses a translation of Zoner Photo Studio from Czech Wikipedia.

Image viewers
Image organizers